"Anything" is the major label debut single from British boy band Damage, released on 8 July 1996. It is the band's second single overall, having released "What U C Iz What U Get" in 1995 before they signed a major record deal. "Anything" was released as the lead single from their debut studio album, Forever, reaching #68 on the UK Singles Chart. The song features an uncredited appearance from rapper Lil' Cease who performs a rap before the final chorus. A music video was created for the track, but it has never been released commercially and does not appear anywhere online. The video also does not feature during the Damage: Our Career in Music special which was regularly broadcast on The Vault.

Track listing
 CD
 "Anything I want" [Radio Mix] - 4:58
 "Anything" [Kojo Mix] - 5:19
 "Everything" [Jones/Bromfield/Richards/Simpson/Harriott, produced by Don-E] - 4:50
 "Anything" [Extended Club Mix] - 4:58

 Cassette
 "Anything" [Radio Mix] - 4:58
 "Everything" - 4:50

 12" vinyl
 "Anything" [Extended Club Mix] - 4:58
 "Anything" [Instrumental] - 4:20
 "Everything" - 4:50
 "Anything" [Kojo Mix] - 5:19

References

External links
Damage on BBC Music
[ Biography at Allmusic.com]

1996 singles
Damage (British band) songs
Big Life Records singles
1996 songs